Better Know a District (also known as BKAD) was a recurring segment on The Colbert Report. It offered a humorous examination of a different United States congressional district in each segment and generally included an interview with that district's member of Congress.

Structure 
Each segment began with basic information about a specific district, such as history and geography, and sometimes a humorously bizarre event that happened there. The district is also almost invariably referred to as "fightin'," as in the "Fightin' 11th." All segments featured an interview with its representative.

One comedic maneuver that Colbert commonly employed in these interviews, particularly when he interviewed Democrats, was to ask the representative a loaded question of either "George W. Bush: great president, or the greatest president?", or "the Iraq War: great war, or the greatest war?" When the interviewee tried to express their disapproval of Bush, Colbert usually stated that the only choice was between "Great or Greatest," and nearly always stated, "I'm gonna put you down for 'Great'." (He often referred to previous Democratic representatives whom he put down as saying Bush was a 'great' president.)

After the interview, Colbert added the segment to "the big board", a map of the entire United States with district lines drawn; the new district, shown in sparkling gold on a blue background, was usually very difficult or impossible to see due to its small size. Though many districts were profiled, the map always looked largely vacant overall.

Reactions of interviewees
Although the interviews intentionally showed most of the representatives in an unflattering light, the representatives' post-interview reactions have varied. Colbert's interview with Massachusetts Representative Barney Frank resulted in Frank lambasting the program (he was quoted on a later Report), while the interview with Virginia Representative Jim Moran pleased the congressman — he told The New York Times that he thought Colbert "let (him) off kind of light."

California Representative Brad Sherman appeared to be in on the joke. He claimed not to know that his San Fernando Valley district was home to the pornography industry, gave an apparently long and dull explanation of a tax proposal, and participated in the making of a "pornographic video" with Colbert and impersonated a robot.

The Washington Times published a story on the show stating that "several lawmakers said doing the spoof spot on 'The Colbert Report' on TV's Comedy Central actually has raised their profiles back home"; however, the Los Angeles Times has reported that due to the fact that many House members have "stumbled badly" during this segment, others are not risking "the price for looking stupid" and were passing up the opportunity to be on Colbert's Better Know A District.

On his November 7, 2006 show, Colbert lauded the fact that every one of the 28 actual congressmen whom he had interviewed by that point won election or reelection, which he claims to have been because they were given the "Colbert Bump".

Because of the way Colbert intentionally tried to skewer congressmen in his interviews, former Democratic Caucus chairman Rahm Emanuel advised his fellow Democrats not to appear on the show, causing Colbert to make fun of Emanuel's advice on the show.  Better Know a District segments subsequently began appearing much less frequently on the Report, suggesting many in Congress took Emanuel's advice. In January 2009, Colbert received what he jocularly claimed was a letter from U.S. Speaker of the House of Representatives Nancy Pelosi and said he was cleared to begin interviewing congressmen once again. However he began the 2009 season of Better Know A District by interviewing Republican congressman Jason Chaffetz instead of a Democratic congressman.

Following the 2010 congressional election on November 2, 2010, for the first time since the show began, a congressman who appeared on the Colbert Reports Better Know a District segment was not reelected in a general election (in fact, several).  On November 3, 2010, Colbert ran a segment showing clips of those fallen friends called "We Hardly Better Knew Ye".

District count

Better Know a District began as a "435-part series," 435 being the number of United States congressional districts; however, on November 29, 2005, Colbert banned California's 50th district after his "friend" Randy "Duke" Cunningham, the 50th's representative, pled guilty to receiving over $2 million in bribes and resigned his seat. California's 50th is now the lone member of the "Never Existed to Me" category, and the map showing the United States' congressional districts now looks as if the district does not even exist. This brought the series to a "434-part series". After this, Texas's 22nd congressional district was retired on April 4, 2006 when Tom DeLay announced that he planned to leave Congress. Texas's 22nd was reinstated on June 8, 2006, with a fake interview in which video of DeLay in three previous interviews on other television networks was interspersed with questions from Colbert. The district was put back into retirement at the end of the segment.

In the show's first year, 34 districts were profiled.

The original district map lacked Michigan’s Upper Peninsula. During a phone-in segment, a resident of Michigan’s 1st, which includes all of the Upper Peninsula as well as a sizable portion of the northern Lower Peninsula, reported this absence. Colbert informed the caller that he lived in Canada and if it was not on Colbert’s map, it was not a part of the United States. The Upper Peninsula was added to the map the next time it was shown.

During the interview with Eleanor Holmes Norton, Colbert established that the District of Columbia was not a state, and thus the District of Columbia was not a part of the United States. The Better Know a District map was updated with an asterisk notation to reflect this fact. Furthermore, the count of 435 districts does not include non-voting districts, such as the District of Columbia; however, this segment was included in the district count, filling in for California's 50th district's absence, restoring the total to 435.

After the 2006 midterm elections, Colbert was invited to a meeting of the incoming House freshmen at Harvard's John F. Kennedy School of Government. During this encounter, he brought his total of "better-known districts" from 36 up to 51 (including a British parliamentary constituency); however, he did not count these as installments, and the count picked up at 37 with the next regular installment. The show aired on December 12, 2006.

After completing the fourth installment on November 9, 2005, he quipped “At the rate of one district a week, we should complete the series by February 2014.” However, in February 2014 he was only on the 87th of 434 districts, leaving him 20% complete after 8.5 years. That rate would place the series completion date in April 2048, had the show not ended.

List of districts "Better Known"
The districts covered in "Better Know a District" are shown below. Segment numbers are listed starting with the 37th installment as they no longer correspond to the actual number of districts profiled. The Washington Post has reprinted transcripts from segments of "Better Know a District".

Season 1 (2005)

Season 2 (2006)

Season 3 (2007)

Season 4 (2008)

Season 5 (2009)

Season 6 (2010)

Season 7 (2011)

Season 8 (2012)

Season 9 (2013)

Season 10 (2014)

Spin-offs

Better Know a Challenger
In the months leading up to the 2006 congressional elections, Colbert interviewed the challengers in several House races. On several occasions he made clear that the challenger was interviewed because the incumbent declined to appear. However this was not always definitively the case. In these cases, the segment is known as "Better Know a Challenger," with different intro graphics.

After the segment, the district was colored on the "Better Know a District" map in goldenrod instead of amber, which is said to be the color all other districts are filled in with. It was upgraded to amber if the challenger won the 2006 election, or downgraded to cadmium yellow if they lost. Of course, it is nearly impossible to see the distinction between these shades on the map. Of the five challengers interviewed, only John Hall defeated an incumbent.

In the instance of New Jersey's 3rd congressional district, Colbert frequently referred to challenger Rich Sexton as representative Jim Saxton, a joke on the similarity of their names.

On May 8, 2014 Colbert resurrected the segment, interviewing Jack Rush who ran in the Florida 3rd district against incumbent Ted Yoho. In the interview, Colbert pretended that guns are people. Colbert also treated characters that Rush played in the past as real people.

Better Know a Protectorate
On March 16, 2006, Colbert introduced a four-part series entitled "Better Know a Protectorate", focusing on the protectorates (more correctly, unincorporated territories) of the United States (which send non-voting delegates to Congress). The formula is relatively the same as with "Better Know a District." Distinctive elements include Colbert attacking the member for their (non-)voting record, and feigning cultural ignorance.  For the first segment, the same "Big Board" as BKAD was used, but was discontinued with the airing of the second segment. The United States Virgin Islands ("the fightin' virgins") was the protectorate that was covered and its delegate, Donna Christian-Christensen, was interviewed.

On April 26, 2007, Guam ("the fightin' Guam") was covered, including an interview with Madeleine Bordallo. A global map was used to produce the "Big Board", given Guam's distance from the continental United States. On August 7, 2007, American Samoa was featured ("the fightin' Samoa") and an interview with Eni Fa'aua'a Hunkin Faleomavaega, Jr. was shown.

The remaining protectorate is presumably Puerto Rico which has not been featured (the Northern Mariana Islands did not have a non-voting member as of the start of the series, although they received a seat after the 2008 elections).

Better Know a Founder
On March 1, 2006, Colbert introduced the "56-part" Better Know a Founder, an in-depth look at the signers of the Declaration of Independence. For this series John Trumbull's painting of The Declaration of Independence is used as the template for the "Big Board".

Using the same formula as Better Know a District, Colbert's first subject in the series was a spotlight of an interview with "Battlin'" Ben Franklin; the actor Ralph Archbold portrayed Franklin for the interview, with both he and Colbert wearing period clothing. Most of the hallmarks of the original segment remained, either in an altered form (e.g., King George: Great king, or the greatest king?) or unchanged (e.g., Colbert anachronistically asks Franklin if he had taken money from Jack Abramoff).

On November 15, 2006, the second installment of BKAF featured three actors portraying President Thomas Jefferson in an America's Next Top Model style segment, America's Top Jefferson, with Project Runway mentor and producer Tim Gunn making an appearance.

Better Know a President
On May 17, 2006, Colbert introduced Better Know a President, a 43-part series that would refresh the viewer's memory of the accomplishments of every president in United States history. The first president covered was Theodore Roosevelt, played by Roosevelt impersonator Jim Foote. In keeping with the running gags of the segment, he asked Roosevelt if the Spanish–American War was merely a great war of American imperialism, or the greatest war of American imperialism. The second covered was Thomas Jefferson. Colbert talked to three different Jefferson impersonators, and judged which was the best.

Meet an Ally
On August 3, 2006 Stephen began the first segment in a series entitled "Meet an Ally" in which he examines nations part of the "Coalition of the Willing". He began the series by interviewing the ambassador of Palau, Stuart Beck.

Betterer Know a District
When Colbert shows an extended segment of an interview at a later date, he calls the segment "Betterer Know a District".

Better Know a Memory
On November 8, 2006, some representatives who were profiled in Better Know a District and had since been re-elected in the previous day's election were reintroduced in a short segment that immediately preceded the commercial breaks. A humorous clip from the BKAD interview would be shown and the words "RETURNED TO CONGRESS" would be rubber stamped onto the still image of the representative. The subjects reintroduced were Eliot L. Engel, Brad Sherman, Lynn Westmoreland, and Robert Wexler.

Better Know a Governor 
On January 21, 2008, after the Republican South Carolina Primary, Colbert interviewed Governor Mark Sanford as the easiest way to learn about all of South Carolinians.

Better Know a Lobby 
On February 6, 2008, Colbert began what he called an "Infinite-long" segment called "Better Know a Lobbyist," where he interviews lobbyists. His first interview was with Joe Solmonese of the Human Rights Campaign, a gay rights organization. This was a two-part interview, with the second half being broadcast on February 7.  On March 12, 2008, it changed to "Better Know a Lobby" and became a 35,000-part-long segment.  The second interview was with Ethan Nadelmann of the Drug Policy Alliance, a lobby demanding the legalization of drugs.  His third interview was with Paul Helmke of the Brady Campaign, a gun control lobby.

Better Know a Beatle
On January 28, 2009, Colbert began what he called the first of a four-part series "Better Know a Beatle", where Colbert intends to interview all of the Beatles starting with his interview with Paul McCartney, bass player, singer-songwriter of the Beatles. Colbert introduced Paul McCartney as "The Fightin' Walrus", a reference to two Beatle songs: "I Am the Walrus" and "Glass Onion".

Better Know a Cradle of Civilization
During his trip to Iraq, Colbert began his one-part series, Better Know a Cradle of Civilization, during which he explained the history of Iraq.

Better Know a Stephen
On December 16, 2009, Colbert began a new segment in which he interviews other prominent men named Stephen (specifically spelled with a "ph"). He started off by interviewing Stephen King.

Better Know a Riding
On February 22, 2010, Colbert began his one-part series, Better Know a Riding, during his coverage of the 2010 Winter Olympics.  The featured riding (a riding is an electoral district in Canada) was Vancouver South, represented by Ujjal Dosanjh.

Better Know a Kissinger
One part series on Henry Kissinger prior to Colbert's interview of Henry Kissinger.

Better Know a Salinger
During the second edition of c'O'lbert Book Club, centered around J.D. Salinger, Colbert profiled the author in 'part one of my one-part series, Better Know a Salinger'. The first and only issue was based on the Fighting J.D.

Better Know a Hemingway
Third edition of Colbert Book Club features this "part one of a one-part series".

Better Know a America
On December 8, 2014, while hosting the show in Washington DC, Colbert debuted another one-part series, Better Know a America [sic].

References

The Colbert Report
Lists of members of the United States House of Representatives
Interviews
Television series segments